Fredrick Charles Trocano (born April 4, 1959) is a former American football quarterback in the National Football League. He was drafted by the Pittsburgh Steelers in the 11th round of the 1981 NFL Draft. He played college football at Pittsburgh.

Trocano also played for the Cleveland Browns.

References

1959 births
Living people
American football quarterbacks
Pittsburgh Panthers football players
Pittsburgh Steelers players
Cleveland Browns players